The 1982 Artistic Gymnastics World Cup was held in Zagreb, SFR Yugoslavia in 1982.

Medal winners

References

1982
Artistic Gymnastics World Cup
International gymnastics competitions hosted by Yugoslavia
1982 in Yugoslav sport